Synaptic is a GTK-based graphical user interface for the APT package manager used by the Debian Linux distribution and its derivatives. Synaptic is usually used on systems based on deb packages but can also be used on systems based on RPM packages. It can be used to install, remove and upgrade software packages and to add repositories.

Features
 Install, remove, upgrade and downgrade single and multiple packages
 System-wide upgrade
 Package search utility
 Manage package repositories
 Find packages by name, description and several other attributes
 Select packages by status, section, name or a custom filter
 Sort packages by name, status, size or version
 Browse available online documentation related to a package
 Download the latest changelog of a package
 Lock packages to the current version
 Force the installation of a specific package version
 Undo/Redo of selections
 Built-in terminal emulator for the package manager
 Allows creation of download scripts (see Usage for more details)

It also has the following features:
 Configure packages through the debconf system
 Xapian-based fast search
 Get screenshots from screenshots.debian.net

Usage
The package manager enables the user to install, to upgrade or to remove software packages. To install or remove a package a user must search or navigate to the package, then mark it for installation or removal. Changes are not applied instantly; the user must first mark all changes and then apply them.

History
Synaptic development was funded by the brazilian company Conectiva, which asked Alfredo Kojima, then an employee, to write a graphical front-end for APT, continuing the work initiated with the creation of the APT RPM back-end, apt-rpm.

See also

 Aptitude (software), an ncurses interface for APT
 GNOME Software
 PackageKit

References

External links

 
 Synaptic in help.ubuntu.com, including the improvements
 Synaptic GitHub page

Dpkg
Free package management systems
Linux package management-related software
Linux PMS graphical front-ends
Package management software that uses GTK
Software update managers